Alexandre Fernandes Dantas (born 1 March 1979) is a Brazilian Jiu-Jitsu instructor and competitor. Dantas formerly fought mixed martial artist. He competed in the Heavyweight division. He lost his last fight at UFC 41 against Gan McGee on 28 February 2003. He is a 3 times world champion in Brazilian jiu-jitsu, the 2002 champion in the open division Brazilian Championship, a 5 times Rio de Janeiro jiu-jitsu champion, the 2007 champion of de ADCC trials in Brazil, the Brazilian Teams Champion at Gracie Barra team, 3-time champion of Brazil X USA jiu-jitsu, 3 time Pan-American jiu-jitsu champion, the 2000 USA Jiu-jitsu champion, 5-time champion of the open division of Copa Café Jiu-jitsu in Miguel Pereira - Rio de Janeiro, among other championships.

Dantas has notable wins in Brazilian jiu-jitsu competition over Rodrigo "Comprido", Gabriel Gonzaga, Fabrício Werdum, "Marcelinho" Garcia, Demian Maia, Bruno Bastos, Fernando Augusto “Tererê”, Marcio "Corleta", and others.

Mixed martial arts record

|-
| Loss
| align=center| 0-3
| Paulo Cesar Melo Jr.
| TKO (corner stoppage)
| EFC Marica 5 - Elite Fighting Championship 5
| 
| align=center| 1
| align=center| 5:00
| Maricá, Rio de Janeiro, Brazil
|
|-
| Loss
| align=center| 0-2
| Gan McGee
| TKO (strikes)
| UFC 41
| 
| align=center| 1
| align=center| 4:49
| Atlantic City, New Jersey, United States
| 
|-
| Loss
| align=center| 0-1
| Yuki Kondo
| TKO (strikes)
| UFC 27
| 
| align=center| 3
| align=center| 2:28
| New Orleans, United States
|

References

External links
 
 

1979 births
Living people
Brazilian practitioners of Brazilian jiu-jitsu
People awarded a black belt in Brazilian jiu-jitsu
Brazilian male mixed martial artists
Heavyweight mixed martial artists
Mixed martial artists utilizing Brazilian jiu-jitsu
Ultimate Fighting Championship male fighters
Sportspeople from Rio de Janeiro (city)
21st-century Brazilian people